The 2021–22 Mississippi State Bulldogs men's basketball team represented Mississippi State University during the 2021–22 NCAA Division I men's basketball season. The team was led by seventh-year head coach Ben Howland, and played their home games at Humphrey Coliseum in Starkville, Mississippi as a member of the Southeastern Conference. They finished the season 18–16, 8–10 in SEC play to finish 10th place. They defeated South Carolina in the second round of the SEC tournament before losing to Tennessee in the quarterfinals. They received an at-large bid to the National Invitation Tournament where they lost in the first round to Virginia.

Following the season, the school fired head coach Howland. On March 20, 2022, the school named New Mexico State head coach Chris Jans the team's new head coach.

Previous season
In a season limited due to the ongoing COVID-19 pandemic, the Bulldogs finished the 2020–21 season 18–15, 8–10 in SEC play to finish in ninth place. They defeated Kentucky in the second round of the SEC tournament before losing to Alabama in the quarterfinals. They received an invitation to the National Invitation Tournament as the fourth seed in the Saint Louis bracket. There they defeated Saint Louis, Richmond, and Louisiana Tech to advance the championship game where they lost to Memphis.

Offseason

Departures

Incoming transfers

2021 recruiting class

2022 Recruiting class

Roster

Schedule and results

|-
!colspan=12 style=|Regular season

|-
!colspan=12 style=| SEC tournament

|-
!colspan=12 style=| NIT tournament

Source

See also
2021–22 Mississippi State Bulldogs women's basketball team

References

Mississippi State Bulldogs men's basketball seasons
Mississippi State Bulldogs
Mississippi State Bulldogs men's basketball
Mississippi State Bulldogs men's basketball
Mississippi State